Fatih Kiran (born 26 May 1993) is a German footballer who plays as a full back for Turkish TFF Second League club Kırşehir FK.

External links

1993 births
Footballers from Munich
German people of Turkish descent
Living people
German footballers
Association football fullbacks
FC Augsburg II players
Sivasspor footballers
Göztepe S.K. footballers
Bandırmaspor footballers
Regionalliga players
Oberliga (football) players
Süper Lig players
TFF Second League players
TFF Third League players
German expatriate footballers
Expatriate footballers in Turkey
German expatriate sportspeople in Turkey